Rollinia herzogii is a species of plant in the Annonaceae family. It occurs in Bolivia and Peru.

References

herzogii
Endemic flora of Peru
Endemic flora of Bolivia
Conservation dependent plants
Near threatened biota of South America
Taxonomy articles created by Polbot
Taxobox binomials not recognized by IUCN